Wielgie  is a village in the administrative district of Gmina Ciepielów, within Lipsko County, Masovian Voivodeship, in east-central Poland.

The village has a population of 668.

References

Wielgie